"Keep Your Head Up is the debut single by British girl group Girls Can't Catch. It was written by Chris Braide and Nina Woodford, and produced by Braide. It was released on 30 July 2009, and entered the UK Singles Chart at number 26. The single reached the top 5 in the Scottish Singles Chart, peaking at number 4.

The group performed the song at several different events, including GMTV, G-A-Y and the iTunes Festival.

Music video
The music video was filmed and released in June 2009. It features the group playing croquet with three guys at a dump site, singing their verses in different parts of the dump site.

Track listing
iTunes Pre-Order
"Keep Your Head Up"
"Keep Your Head Up" (Acoustic)

CD1:
"Keep Your Head Up" (Braide, Woodford)
"Stop" (Daizy Agnew, Jess Stickley, Phoebe Brown, Viktoria Hanson, Jonathan Douglas)

Maxi CD-single
"Keep Your Head Up"
"Kimberly Walsh from Girls Aloud interviews GCC Part 1"
"Keep Your Head Up" (Music Video)
"Keep Your Head Up" (Riff & Rays Remix Video)

iTunes EP
"Keep Your Head Up" (Riff and Rays Club Mix)
"Keep Your Head Up" (Soulseekerz Club Mix)
"Keep Your Head Up" (Starsmith Club Mix)

Other download stores
"Keep Your Head Up"
"Keep Your Head Up" (Riff and Rays Radio Edit)
"Keep Your Head Up" (Soulseekerz Radio Edit)
"Keep Your Head Up" (Starsmith Radio Edit)

Live performances
 G-A-Y — 8 April 2009
 Out of Control Tour — 24 April 2009 - 6 June 2009
 Hollyoaks — 25 June 2009
 Glastonbury Festival — 26 June 2009
 Waterstones, Piccadilly Circus — 4 July 2009
 5:19 Show — 13 July 2009
 GMTV — 24 July 2009
 Tramlines Festival — 25 July 2009
 iTunes Festival — 27 July 2009
 Loose Women — 29 July 2009
 G-A-Y — 1 August 2009
 The Alan Titchmarsh Show — 4 December 2009

Charts

Release details

References

2008 songs
2009 debut singles
Songs written by Chris Braide
Songs written by Nina Woodford
Song recordings produced by Chris Braide
Fascination Records singles